William Lowther may refer to:

Politicians
William Lowther (died c.1421), MP for Cumberland (UK Parliament constituency)
William Lowther (MP for Appleby), in 1420, MP for Appleby (UK Parliament constituency)
Sir William Lowther (died 1688) (c. 1612–1688), Member of Parliament for Pontefract 1661–1679
Sir William Lowther (1639–1705), Member of Parliament for Pontefract 1695–1698
Sir William Lowther, 1st Baronet, of Swillington (1663–1729), Member of Parliament for Pontefract 1701–1710 and 1716–1729
William Lowther (1668–1694), Member of Parliament for Carlisle 1692–1694
Sir William Lowther, 1st Baronet, of Marske (1676–1705), Member of Parliament for Lancaster 1702–1705
Sir William Lowther, 2nd Baronet (c. 1694–1763), Member of Parliament for Pontefract 1729–1741
Sir William Lowther, 3rd Baronet (1727–1756), Member of Parliament for Cumberland 1755–1756
William Lowther, 1st Earl of Lonsdale (1757–1844), Member of Parliament for Carlisle, Cumberland and Rutland
William Lowther, 2nd Earl of Lonsdale (1787–1872), Member of Parliament for Cockermouth, Dunwich, West Cumberland and Westmorland
William Lowther (diplomat) (1821–1912), Member of Parliament for Appleby 1885–1892 and Westmorland 1868–1885

Others
Sir William Lowther, 1st Baronet, of Little Preston (1707–1788), English landowner and curate